|}

This is a list of electoral district results for the 1920 Queensland state election.

At the time, the voting system in Queensland was based on contingency voting, which was similar to the modern optional preferential voting system. In electorates with 3 or more candidates, preferences were not distributed if a candidate received more than 50% of the primary vote.

If none received more than 50%, all except the top two candidates were eliminated from the count and their preferences distributed between the two leaders, with the one receiving the most votes declared the winner.

Results by electoral district

Albert

Aubigny

Balonne

Barcoo

Bowen

Bremer

Brisbane

Bulimba

Bundaberg

Buranda

Burke

Burnett

Burrum

Cairns

Carnarvon

Charters Towers

Chillagoe

Cook

Cooroora

Cunningham

Dalby

Drayton

Eacham

East Toowoomba

Enoggera

Fassifern

Fitzroy

Flinders

Fortitude Valley

Gregory

Gympie

Herbert

Ipswich

Ithaca

Kennedy

Keppel

Kurilpa

Leichhardt

Lockyer

Logan

Mackay

Maranoa

Maree

Maryborough

Merthyr

Mirani

Mitchell

Mount Morgan

Mundingburra

Murilla

Murrumba

Musgrave

Nanango

Normanby

Nundah

Oxley

Paddington

By-elections 

 This by-election was caused by the resignation of John Fihelly. It was held on 11 March 1922.

Pittsworth

Port Curtis

Queenton

Rockhampton

By-election 

 This by-election was caused by the resignation of Frank Forde, who entered Federal politics. It was held on 17 February 1923.

Rosewood

South Brisbane

Stanley

Toombul

Toowong

Toowoomba

Townsville

Warrego

Warwick

Wide Bay

Windsor

See also 

 1920 Queensland state election
 Candidates of the Queensland state election, 1920
 Members of the Queensland Legislative Assembly, 1920-1923

References 

Results of Queensland elections